McMinn County Airport  is a county-owned, public-use airport located three nautical miles (6 km) southeast of the central business district of Athens, a city in McMinn County, Tennessee, United States.

Facilities and aircraft 
It has one runway designated 2/20 with a 6,450 by 75 ft (1,966 x 23 m) asphalt surface.

For the 12-month period ending December 16, 1998, the airport had 30,000 aircraft operations, an average of 82 per day: 98% general aviation, 2% air taxi and <1% military. At that time there were 63 aircraft based at this airport: 95% single-engine, 3% multi-engine and 2% jet.

The fixed-base operator at McMinn County airport is Athens Air, LLC.

The airport is attended from 0830 to dusk and has 100LL aviation fuel and Jet A. It is included under the Nashville FSS.  It has medium intensity runway lighting, REIL on Runway 02, and VASI on both runways. NOTAMs are filed with Nashville International Airport.

See also 
 List of airports in Tennessee

References

External links 

Airports in Tennessee
Buildings and structures in McMinn County, Tennessee
Transportation in McMinn County, Tennessee